The Genlyte Group was a company that manufactured and sold lighting fixtures and controls. Products designed by the Genlyte Group include indoor and outdoor fixtures for the commercial, residential, theater, and industrial markets.  Genlyte was bought out by Royal Philips Lighting on January 18, 2008.
Since the completing the acquisition of the Genlyte Group, the individual lighting companies were reorganized by Philips into the Philips Lighting Business Unit - Professional Luminaires North America, headquartered in Burlington, MA.

Genlyte Brands 
There were several brands owned by Genlyte, they were:
 
Alkco
ALLscape 
Ardee 
Bronzelite
Canlyte
Capri
Chloride Systems
Crescent
d'ac Lighting
Day-Brite
Emco
ExceLine
Entertainment Technology
Forecast 
Gardco
Guth
Hadco 
Hanover Lantern 
HighLites
Hoffmeister
Horizon
LAM Lighting Systems
Ledalite
Lightolier
Lightolier Controls
Lite-Energy
Lumec
mcPhilben
Metrolux
Morlite 
NiteLife
Nessen Lighting
Omega
Quality Lighting
Shakespeare Composite Structures
Specialty Lighting
Stonco
Strand Lighting
Translite-Sonoma
Thomas Lighting Residential
Thomas Lighting Canada
U.S.S Manufacturing
Vari-Lite
Vista
Wide-Lite

References

External links 
Genlyte official site
Philips Professional Luminaires site
ALLscape site
Bronzelite site
d'ac Lighting
Hadco site
Hadco LED site
Hadco University site
Hanover Lantern site
Nessen Lighting
Project by Hadco site
U.S.S Manufacturing
Stonco Lighting
Lighting brands